Auriens is a luxury retirement complex in Chelsea, London, in Dovehouse Street, overlooking Dovehouse Green and the King's Road.

Auriens is being built on the site of what was the London Borough of Kensington and Chelsea's only local authority care home. It is scheduled to be completed in 2019. There will be 55 apartments, priced between £3 to £10.5 million.

The company was co-founded by Karen Mulville (wife of Jimmy Mulville) and Johnny Sandelson.

References

External links

Chelsea, London